Proceedings of SPIE is the conference record of the Society of Photo-Optical Instrumentation Engineers (SPIE). The first proceedings were published in 1963.

Indexing and abstracting
Proceedings of SPIE is indexed and abstracted in:

References

External links
 

Optics journals
Publications established in 1963
Conference proceedings published in serials
SPIE academic journals